Dennis Lindskjold (born 21 December 1977) is a Danish former professional darts player.

Career

Lindskjold has been picked 7 times for the Danish national team.

In September 2012, he won a Scandinavian Pro Tour event in Denmark by defeating Niels Jorgen Hansen 6–3 in the final.
A year later he beat Soren Hedegaard, Jarkko Komula, Magnus Caris and Jani Haavisto to qualify for the 2014 PDC World Championship.
At the World Championship, Lindskjold was supposed to face Edward Santos in the preliminary round but due to visa trouble for the Philippine, Lindskjold faced Colin Osborne instead. Lindskjold won the first leg but went on to be beaten 4–1.

He won the 2014 Nordic Cup Open by beating Mats Andersson in the final. Lindskjold made his debut in the World Cup of Darts in 2014, representing Denmark with Per Laursen and they were eliminated 5–2 by Australia in the first round. Laursen defeated Lindskjold in the final of the 2015 DDL Esbjerg event.

World Championship results

PDC
 2014: Preliminary round (lost to Colin Osborne 1–4) (legs)

References

External links
 Dennis Lindskjold stats at the Darts Database

Danish darts players
Living people
Professional Darts Corporation associate players
1977 births
People from Sønderborg Municipality
PDC World Cup of Darts Danish team
Sportspeople from the Region of Southern Denmark